Ongaonga is a Maori word meaning distaste, dislike or repulsive and may refer to:

 Ongaonga, New Zealand, a township in New Zealand
 Urtica ferox, a native tree nettle from New Zealand
 Te Uri Ongaonga, part of the Eastern Bay of Islands, Ngāpuhi, New Zealand

See also
 Onga (disambiguation)